Member of Provincial Assembly Sanaullah Baloch, is a Baloch nationalist leader from the Balochistan National Party (BNP-Mengal). He is a former member of the National Assembly of Pakistan and the Senate of Pakistan. He also served as a senior Governance Expert, political strategist, researcher, and writer with hands-on expertise on Asia, Africa, and the Middle East, providing advice and leadership on Constitution Making, Political and Institutional reforms/restructuring, Parliamentary Reforms, Peace Building and Public Participation. 
He served as the Member Senate of Pakistan (2003–2008) and as a Member of the National Assembly (1997–2002). Along with his parliamentary experience, he served as UNDP's senior adviser (Chief Technical Adviser) in Sierra Leone (2013-2017) and Somalia in 2011. Mr. Baloch has experience of developing, managing and coordinating high-impact governance projects such as constitution making processes, legislative reform, peace negotiations and power-sharing with specific focus on youth, women and marginalized groups.  Provided expertise in analysing and developing institutional and cross departmental responses to challenges posed in complex conflict and post conflict polarized operating environments.

Mr. Baloch also served as a Parliamentary Secretary to the Interior and Narcotics Control Division in 1998. In addition, he served as a member of the Senate Function Committee on Government Assurances, Local Government and Problems of Less Developed areas.

As a member of the Senate of Pakistan and representative of Balochistan province, articulated on the issues of regions political and economic rights and fair distribution of resources. He introduced a constitutional amendment bill to abolish the concurrent legislative list to grant more autonomy to the provinces which led to the landmark 18th Constitutional Amendment in Pakistan.

Sanaullah Baloch was also appointed as a Member of Parliament special committee on Balochistan formed in September 2004, where he was the major architect of drafting and placing Balochistan's major political and economic issues before the committee.

In 2005, he was a participant at Stanford University's Draper Hills Summer Fellows on Democracy and Development at Stanford's CDDRL.

He contributed number of articles on ethnic politics, democracy, and nationalism. He mostly writes and speaks at national and international forums on the issue of ethnic politics in Pakistan. His first book was published in 2001. He has written, mainly about the politics and society of Balochistan, Pakistan in several leading South Asian English language newspapers and magazines, including Dawn, the News, and the Nation.

Mr. Baloch research and professional expertise are in the field of Democracy, Constitutionalism, Federalism, human rights and Ethnic Minorities in Pakistan, Iran and Afghanistan. He delivered talks, lectures, seminars and presentations in world's renowned institutes, universities and think-tank organizations for senior government officials, youth, parliamentarians and members of constitutional bodies. He speaks, read and write English, Balochi, Persian, Pushto, Urdu, Brahvi languages.

References 

Living people
Baloch people
Balochistan National Party (Mengal) politicians
Members of the Senate of Pakistan
Pakistani expatriates in Sierra Leone
Politicians from Balochistan, Pakistan
National Defence University, Pakistan alumni
Year of birth missing (living people)